Nganda is a small town and urban commune of the Kaffrine Department in the Kaffrine Region of Senegal, lying close to the border with Gambia.

According to an official source, Nganda's population in 2002 was 1,597 inhabitants in 149 households.

References

Communes of Senegal
Kaffrine Region
Populated places in Kaffrine Region